BWG Foods UC is an Irish wholesaler and retail grocery franchise operator.

BWG is the second largest wholesaler in Ireland in terms of sales, after Musgrave Group, with sales of over €1.7 billion annually. It used to be owned by a consortium run by Leo Crawford, John O'Donnell and John Clohessy. In later years, The Spar Group (TSG) of South Africa acquired an 80% stake in BWG in 2015 for €55 million. In 2021 TSG gained full control over BWG and owns 100% thereof.  The company head office is based in Tallaght, Dublin, Ireland.

History 
In 2000, BWG purchased the Mace franchise area in Munster owned by Vantage Wholesale, merging it with its existing franchise area in Leinster.

As of 2002, BWG was owned by Pernod Ricard who had acquired the business as part of Irish Distillers, but offered it for sale as it was not core to their business. BWG was sold via a management buyout financed by Electra Partners Europe for 220m euro. The current owners bought out Electra in 2006 through a vehicle called Triode, with a value of 390m euro placed on the firm.

BWG bought Tolan's Foodservice based in Galway in July 2003, and renamed it "BWG Foodservice". Also in 2003, BWG sold its Bellevue cash & carry's in Edinburgh and Stirling, Scotland in October, 5 years after buying it. The Northern Ireland subsidiary J&J Haslett, which held the franchise for Mace was sold in December 2003 via a management buy out. (Musgrave Group subsequently bought J&J Haslett). The Bargain Booze off-licence chain in the United Kingdom was sold in 2004.

In 2008, BWG bought Mangan Bros Ltd a wholesaler based in Ennis, County Clare. With this purchase BWG took control of Mace franchise throughout Ireland. The business consisted of 8 cash and carries in the West of Ireland, and a distribution centre in Collooney in County Sligo supplying Mace stores. BWG promptly closed the Collooney centre and integrated it into their Ballyshannon facility. Seven Cash & Carry closures follow due to location overlaps and duplication, and all sites are now branded Value Centre.

As of September 2010, the company announced the closure of their warehouse in Ballyshannon, County Donegal, with the business transferring into the centre at Walkinstown, Dublin.

In May 2012 BWG acquired Morris Bros of Convoy Donegal. Morris Bros operate a Distribution Centre that supply Gala stores and independent retailers in the north west of Ireland. In June 2012 a new ambient Distribution Centre opened in Kilcarberry, Dublin with the aim of consolidating distribution of ambient goods to all Spar and Mace stores under one roof, including its Bonded warehouse. The new 240,000 sq ft centre resulted in the closure of the existing centres in Limerick and Walkinstown, and was expected to handle 26 million cases per year. BWG announced a partnership with Donnellys Fruit & Veg in August 2012. This saw a new separate distribution centre for chilled foods set up in Kilshane Cross, Dublin. The centre distributed fruit & veg, meats and other chilled products to all BWG's franchise stores nationwide. It affected BWG's Central billing business as a result.

Notable operations

Spar 
It is the master franchise operator for the SPAR, Spar Express and EuroSpar brands in Ireland, with approximately 450 Spar stores. Spar Ireland reported €1.67 billion in retail sales in 2007.
In Ireland Spar operates in-store franchises for Tim Hortons coffee, Insomnia Coffee Company, Kitsu noodles and Treehouse smoothies among others.

In the south-west of England BWG also own Appleby Westward Foods. This is a small regional SPAR wholesaler based in Saltash, Cornwall.

Mace 
BWG holds the master franchise for the Mace chain of 230 stores in Ireland. Maxol and Mace also have an exclusive deal that sees most Maxol owned forecourt shops branded Mace.

Other operations
Newhill, BWG's retail subsidiary owns over 100 stores which are leased/rented to operators for an agreed percentage of turnover. The stores trade as Spar and Mace.

BWG Foodservice 
BWG Foodservice is a division which offers a full frozen/chill/ambient range aimed at the foodservice channel. The business was born from the purchase of Tolan foodservice and the main depot is still at the same site in Galway. A new site was opened at North Road, Dublin in 2007, and later a third in Cork. These sites are also Value Centres.

Value Centre 
BWG owns Ireland's largest Cash & Carry chain, Value Centre, which has 22 branches nationwide.

Value Centre offer XL to its Value Centre customers as a franchise option. It is a more cost-effective way for retailers who are not suited to a full brand offering, like Spar, to get the benefits of franchise membership. They still receive the benefit of Central billing without the expense or requirements of larger franchises. Competitors include Gala Express operated by Stonehouse Wholesale, and Daytoday operated by Musgrave.

See also
List of Irish companies

References

External links
Official Website

Retail companies of Ireland
Companies based in Dublin (city)